"Where You At" is a song recorded by American recording artist Jennifer Hudson. It was written and produced by fellow R&B singer R. Kelly for her second album I Remember Me (2011). Released as the album's lead single, the song debuted on January 24, 2011 and was released on February 8, 2011. Remixes for the song have been made by Dave Audé. The track reached number one on the US Billboard Adult R&B singles chart. In 2019, Hudson removed the song from all streaming platforms and stopped performing it live in support of several women who had come forward with stories of abuse at the hands of Kelly.

Critical reception
The song received acclaim from music critics. Thomas Conner from Chicago Sun-Times admired Hudson's voice saying,  Where You At,' written and produced by fellow South Sider R. Kelly, roars to a big finish with Hudson shouting, 'Deliver!' until she rockets right off the treble clef—just in time for an incredibly ill-advised fade-out." Elysa Gardner from USA Today claims, "It's a credit to the singer's personal grace and her artistic instincts that she avoids easy sentimentality, dressing down a lover on R. Kelly-written single Where You At..." Kevin Ritchie from Now Magazine enjoyed the lyrics, calling it a "vivid riposte to an elusive lover." Genevieve Koshi from The A.V. Club acclaimed the song by saying, "the R. Kelly-written-and-produced “Where You At” manages a comparatively subtler, sexy groove, and sounds pretty much exactly like you’d expect an R. Kelly song sung by Jennifer Hudson to sound." The music video for the song also won the NAACP Image Award for Outstanding Music Video at the 43rd NAACP Image Awards.

Promotion
Hudson performed "Where You At" on The Oprah Winfrey Show on February 10, 2011. She performed the song on March 23, 2011, on "The Wendy Williams Show"  She also performed the song on The Ellen DeGeneres Show which aired on February 16, 2011 and on The View on March 22, 2011. On March 25, 2011 she performed the track on American Idol.

Music video
The music video for "Where You At" premiered on BET's 106 & Park and Vevo.com on February 24, 2011 and was directed by Anthony Mandler.

Track listing

"Where You At" – 3:30
"Where You At" (Dave Audé Club Instrumental) – 6:45
"Where You At" (Dave Audé Club Mix) – 6:45
"Where You At" (Dave Audé Dub) – 6:15
"Where You At" (Dave Audé Mixshow) – 5:22
"Where You At" (Dave Audé Radio Edit) – 4:08

Chart performance
The single first appeared on the US Billboard Hot R&B/Hip-Hop Songs chart at number 53 and peaked at number 10. It also debuted at number 96 on the Billboard Hot 100 chart. In its third week and during the album's release week, the song jumped 25 positions to number 64 on the chart.

Weekly charts

Year-end charts

Radio debut and release history

References

External links
 JenniferHudsonOnline.com — official site

2011 songs
Jennifer Hudson songs
Contemporary R&B ballads
Songs written by R. Kelly
Song recordings produced by R. Kelly
Music videos directed by Anthony Mandler
2011 singles